The Vendôme was a 72-gun ship of the line of the French Royal Navy, the smallest ship to be classed as a First Rank ship in the French Navy. She was built at Brest Dockyard, designed and constructed by Laurent Hubac. She was nominally a three-decker, but in practice the upper deck was divided into armed sections aft and forward of the unarmed waist, making the upper deck equivalent to a quarterdeck and forecastle.

Service history 
The Vendôme began to go into commission in March 1665, began reconstruction at Brest Dockyard in August 1665, and became flagship of the Ponant (Atlantic) Fleet under chef d'escadre Abraham Duquesne on 29 April 1666.

Disposal 
Her name was technically altered to Victorieux on 24 June 1671, but this was not put into practice as she was condemned on 17 July 1671 and she became a careening hulk at Brest until condemned in 1679.

Sources and references 

Nomenclature des Vaisseaux du Roi-Soleil de 1661 a 1715. Alain Demerliac (Editions Omega, Nice – various dates).
The Sun King's Vessels (2015) - Jean-Claude Lemineur; English translation by François Fougerat. Editions ANCRE.  
Winfield, Rif and Roberts, Stephen (2017) French Warships in the Age of Sail 1626-1786: Design, Construction, Careers and Fates. Seaforth Publishing. . 

 Vaisseaux de Ligne Français de 1682 à 1780 1

Ships of the line of the French Navy
1650s ships